Avinash Pasricha is a photographer, who has predominantly worked, captured and photographed Indian classical artists.

References

Year of birth missing (living people)
Living people
Indian photographers